"Secret" is a song recorded by American rock band Heart. It was released as the fourth and final single from the band's tenth studio album Brigade.

The track is a rock power ballad which did not meet with much mainstream success, peaking at number sixty-four on the U.S. Billboard Hot 100 and number seventy-nine on the UK Singles Chart.

Background
As an emotional song, it portrays forbidden love and the tragedy that the situation is.

A music video to "Secret" documents the Japanese leg of the Brigade Tour.

Chart performance

References 

Heart (band) songs
1991 singles
Rock ballads
Song recordings produced by Richie Zito
Songs written by Franne Golde
Songs written by Bruce Roberts (singer)